Ice Nine is a first-person shooter video game for the Game Boy Advance. It was one of the final first-person shooters on the console. It was originally going to be a tie-in with the film The Recruit. However, this fell through, but the plot of the game remains unchanged. There was also a planned PlayStation 2 version, but it was canceled at some point in development.

Plot 

The plot of Ice Nine is similar to the film The Recruit on which it was previously based. The player takes control of the recruit Tom Carter on a mission to stop an evil plot to steal the diabolical computer virus "Ice Nine". Over the course of the game, Carter unravels a conspiracy within the CIA.

Reception 
Ice Nine was met with lukewarm reviews. It was praised for its above-average graphics and music, but criticized for its boring level design in comparison with earlier shooters such as Ecks vs. Sever. It currently has a 44% overall average on GameRankings.

References 

2005 video games
Cancelled PlayStation 2 games
First-person shooters
Game Boy Advance games
Game Boy Advance-only games
Video games based on films
Spy video games
Multiplayer and single-player video games
Video games developed in Australia
Sprite-based first-person shooters
Video games with 2.5D graphics
Torus Games games